This is a list of diplomatic missions of the Central African Republic, excluding honorary consulates. Nineteen countries have resident diplomatic representatives in Bangui, and the C.A.R. maintains approximately the same number of missions abroad. Since early 1989 the government recognizes both Israel and the Palestinian state. The C.A.R. also maintains diplomatic relations with the People's Republic of China. The C.A.R. generally joins other African and developing country states in consensus positions on major policy issues. The most important countries with which C.A.R. maintain bilateral relations include France, Cameroon, Chad, DR Congo, R Congo, Gabon, Sudan, Pakistan and the US.

Africa

 Yaoundé (Embassy)
 Douala (Consulate)

 N'Djamena (Embassy)

 Brazzaville (Embassy)

 Kinshasa (Embassy)

Cairo (Embassy)

 Malabo (Embassy)

 Addis Ababa (Embassy)

Abidjan (Embassy)

 Rabat (Embassy)

Abuja (Embassy)

 Pretoria (Embassy)

Khartoum (Embassy)

America

 Washington, D.C. (Embassy)

Asia

Beijing (Embassy)

 Kuwait City (Embassy)

 Doha (Embassy)

Europe

Brussels (Embassy)

Paris (Embassy)

Moscow (Embassy)

Multilateral organisations

 New York (delegation to the United Nations)

See also
Foreign relations of the Central African Republic

References

External links

Central African Republic
Diplomatic missions